Mohammad Sajid Dhot (born 10 December 1997), is an Indian professional footballer who plays as a defender for Chennaiyin in the Indian Super League.

Career

Early career
Born in Punjab, Dhot started his footballing career at the St. Stephen's Football Academy Chandigarh, under the coaching of Harjinder Singh. Dhot eventually, along with the rest of the India under-17 side, moved to the United States to train at the IMG Academy for a year. While in the US, Dhot played in tournaments such as the IMG Cup and the Dallas Cup. After returning to India, Dhot joined the AIFF Elite Academy and played for the side in the I-League U19.

DSK Shivajians
Before the 2015–16 I-League, Dhot signed for the newly promoted side DSK Shivajians. He made his professional debut for the side on 14 February 2016 against Salgaocar.

International
Dhot was part of the India under-13 and under-14 sides that took part in the AFC football festivals. His performance during the festival helped Dhot earn his year abroad in the United States. Dhot soon represented India at the under-16 level. Dhot has also represented India at the under-19 level.

Career statistics

Club

International career

Honours

India
 SAFF Championship runner-up: 2018

References

External links 
 All India Football Federation Profile
 DSK Shivajians Profile

1997 births
Living people
People from Punjab, India
Indian footballers
DSK Shivajians FC players
Association football defenders
Footballers from Punjab, India
I-League players
India youth international footballers
AIFF Elite Academy players
Indian Super League players
Odisha FC players
India international footballers